Brzyków may refer to the following places in Poland:
Brzyków, Lower Silesian Voivodeship (south-west Poland)
Brzyków, Łódź Voivodeship (central Poland)